"Lost on the River" is a song written by Hank Williams.  It was released as a duet with his wife Audrey Williams on MGM Records in 1950.

Background
Williams' recording of "Lost on the River" is significant for three reasons: it was recorded at Herzog Studio in Cincinnati rather than Castle Studio in Nashville; it features a mandolin solo, an instrument that rarely appears on Hank's studio recordings; and it's the first duet the singer released with his wife Audrey.  Near the end of 1948, Williams had been working the Louisiana Hayride in Shreveport and had not recorded in over a year because of the American Federation of Musicians recording ban, but producer Fred Rose immediately scheduled a session in Cincinnati on December 22, 1948 - eight days after the ban ended.  Hank and Audrey drove from Shreveport to Cincinnati to meet him.  The session in Cincinnati is best remembered for producing what would become Hank's breakout hit in early 1949, "Lovesick Blues," but the recording of "Lost on the River" is also notable for Clyde Baum's mandolin solo.  Williams would use Baum's mandolin again on "May You Never Be Alone" but generally avoided the instrument for practical purposes; he loved string band music, but rarely brought the mandolin into his lineup because he preferred the electric "take off" guitar that Ernest Tubb had popularized, which could cut through a noisy barroom as no mandolin ever could. The other players on the session included Tommy Jackson (fiddle), Jerry Byrd (steel guitar), Louis Innis (rhythm guitar), and Willie Thawl (bass).  The song contains one of Hank's recurring themes: despair from the abandonment of a lover who will soon remarry.

The decision to record the song as a duet with Audrey was, at best, questionable.  While Audrey's belief in her husband's talent and her determination to see him succeed were crucial components in Hank's rise to the top, her insistence on inserting herself into the Drifting Cowboys and recording her own songs confounded those around her who marveled at her incompetence as a singer.  "He'd let her sing," steel guitarist Don Helms told American Masters. "She wanted to and he'd let her.  And we all know that Audrey was not a great singer.  He came off stage one day and said, 'Boy, it's rough to have a wife who wants to sing, but it's hell to have a wife who wants to sing and can't.'"  In the same documentary, Drifting Cowboy Clent Holmes recalls, "He'd write a song and he'd get up there and sing it on the radio, and she'd tell him he wouldn't singin' it right, or he missed something in it.  And that would upset him.  He said, 'I wrote that song, I know how it's  to go.'  That would cause a big argument and she never would back down."  Louisiana Hayride producer Horace Logan was less charitable, telling country music historian Colin Escott, "Audrey was a pure, unmitigated, hard-boiled, blue-eyed bitch.  She wanted to be a singer and she was horrible, unbelievably horrible.  She not only tried to sing, she insisted on it." Perhaps feeling guilty about his own bad behaviour, such as his frequent bouts of drunkenness,  Hank indulged his wife's ambitions.  None of their duets became hits, however, and after the release of "Lovesick Blues" Hank would become a country superstar.

Mark Knopfler and Emmylou Harris recorded the song for the 2001 album Timeless: Hank Williams Tribute.

References

Songs written by Hank Williams
Hank Williams songs
1948 songs
Song recordings produced by Fred Rose (songwriter)